Mario Rodolfo Gayraud (born November 9, 1957 in Buenos Aires province), is a retired Argentine racing driver. He won the TC2000 championship in 1984.

References

1957 births
Living people
Argentine racing drivers
Turismo Carretera drivers
TC 2000 Championship drivers
Top Race V6 drivers